"Mo Bounce" is a song recorded by Australian rapper Iggy Azalea. It was released on 23 March 2017 and it debuted on Zane Lowe's Beats 1 radio show. It was produced by The Stereotypes and Far East Movement.

The song was teased from the beginning of the month of March with various pictures posted on her social networks, some of them being GIFs. The song was originally released as a second single from her then-forthcoming second studio album, then titled Digital Distortion, before being shelved and the album being scrapped.

Critical reception
Billboard commented that "the upbeat tempo and the fun and loud lyrics mirror the happier-sounding track and perhaps her [Iggy's] life right now." Claire Lobenfeld from Fact gave a negative review, calling the song "a blog house revival nightmare." According to Hardeep Phull from New York Post, the song is "the best thing the 26-year-old has released since her glory days of 2014" and "ultra-catchy", also pointing out "it's the strong comeback she desperately needs." "Mo Bounce" was among the Stereotypes's recognized body of work that secured their Producer of the Year, Non-Classical nomination at the 60th Annual Grammy Awards. Time magazine ranked it as the fifth worst song of 2017, saying "the repetitive 'bounce, bounce, bounce' chorus was actually a respite" from Azalea's lyrics.

Music video
The music video was shot in Hong Kong by director Lil Internet in late February. On 20 March 2017, Vevo announced the video would also be premiering on 24 March. On March 21, Iggy Azalea posted a series of GIFs on her Twitter profile from the music video as she partnered with Giphy to release a promotional set. There are multiple instances where young women are twerking, as well as Iggy doing so. On March 22, Vevo released a 20-second video promoting Iggy Azalea's single.

The official music video was released on 24 March 2017 on Vevo.

In June 2018, the music video has received 60 million views on YouTube.

Track listing
Digital download (Explicit version)
"Mo Bounce" – 3.42

Digital download (Clean version)
"Mo Bounce" – 3:42

Digital download (Remixes EP)
"Mo Bounce" (Deadly Zoo Remix) – 3:20
"Mo Bounce" (Eden Prince Remix) – 3:02
"Mo Bounce" (Dirtcaps Remix) – 3:38

Charts

Release history

See also
 Cultural history of the buttocks

References

External links
 

2017 songs
2017 singles
Def Jam Recordings singles
Iggy Azalea songs
Song recordings produced by the Stereotypes
Songs written by Iggy Azalea
Songs written by Jonathan Yip
Songs written by Ray Romulus
Songs written by Jeremy Reeves
Songs written by Ray Charles McCullough II
Songs written by Verse Simmonds